Westberg is a Swedish topographic surname, which means "west mountain" or "west hill", from the Swedish terms väst ("west") and berg ("mountain" or "hill"). Alternative spellings include Wästberg, Västberg and Vestberg. The surname may refer to:

Anna Westberg (1946–2005), a Swedish novelist and non-fiction writer
Curt Westberg (born 1943), a Swedish Air Force major general
Emelie Westberg (born 1990), a Swedish handball player
Erik Westberg (born 1956), a Swedish conductor and professor in music performance
Granger E. Westberg (1913–1999), an American Lutheran clergyman and professor
Hans Vestberg (born 1965), a Swedish businessman
Jacob Westberg (1885–1933), a Swedish long-distance runner
Johanna Westberg (born 1990), a Swedish handball player
Karolina Westberg (born 1978), a Swedish footballer
Leslie J. Westberg (1920–1997), an American brigadier
Niklas Westberg (born 1979), a Swedish footballer
Norman Westberg, an American guitarist
Maria Westberg (1853–1893), a Swedish ballerina
Peter Westberg (born 1995), a Swedish footballer
Rune Westberg (born 1974), a Danish songwriter, record producer, and mixer
Quentin Westberg (born 1986), a French-American soccer player

See also
Wästberg

References

Swedish-language surnames